George William Quellich (February 10, 1906 – August 31, 1958) was a Major League Baseball player. He batted and threw right-handed.

Quellich is a member of the International League Hall of Fame.

He was born in and died in Johnsville, California.

References

External links

1906 births
1958 deaths
Major League Baseball outfielders
Detroit Tigers players
Martinsburg Blue Sox players
Baseball players from California